Shareeka is a Pakistani film, in Punjabi , which was written and directed by Syed Noor. The film was released on Eid-ul-Fitr 2012.

Plot
The movie is based upon the lives of seven conservative families living together in one 'Haveli' in a Punjabi Village.

Cast

Release
The film was released on Eid-ul-Fitr, 20 August 2012.

References

External links
 

Punjabi-language Pakistani films
2012 films
Films directed by Syed Noor
2010s Punjabi-language films